Pierre Lescot (c. 1515 – 10 September 1578) was a French architect active during the French Renaissance.  His most notable works include the Fontaine des Innocents and the Lescot wing of the Louvre in Paris.  He played an important role in the introduction of elements of classical architecture into French architecture.

Biography
Lescot was born in Paris. King Francis I of France took him into his service, and appointed him architect in charge of the building projects at the Palais du Louvre, which transformed the old château into the palace that we know. A project put forward by the Italian architect and theorist Sebastiano Serlio was set aside in favor of Lescot's, in which three sides of a square court were to be enclosed by splendid apartments, while on the east, facing the city as it then was, the fourth side was probably destined to be lightly closed with an arcade. Festive corner pavilions of commanding height and adorned by pillars and statues were to replace the medieval towers. Elsewhere in the Louvre, little was actually achieved beyond razing some of the old feudal structure.

Though Lescot was confirmed in his position after the king's death by his heir Henry II, and though he worked at the Louvre project until his death, only the west side and part of the south side were completed, comprising the present southwest wing of the Cour Carré, the Aile Lescot, or "Lescot Wing" (illustration). Even so, the building was executed from 1546 to 1551 set the mold of French classicism: it is of two stories with an attic richly embellished with Jean Goujon's panels of bas-reliefs; it is crowned by a sloping roof, a traditional feature of French building and practical in a rainy climate. The deeply recessed arch-headed windows of the ground story give the impression of an arcade, while the projecting central and end pavilions bear small round oeil de boeuf windows above them. In the second storey slender fluted pilasters separate the windows, which alternate delicate triangular and arched pediments.  Goujon's noble sculpture and architectural ornaments are cleverly subordinated to the construction, but the surviving groundfloor Salle des Caryatides (1546–49) is named for Goujon's four caryatid figures that support the musicians' gallery. Of Lescot's constructions at the Louvre there also remain the Salle des Gardes and the Henry II staircase.

His first achievements (1540 – 1545) were the rood-screen in Saint-Germain l'Auxerrois, of which only some sculptures by Goujon have been saved and in Paris the Hôtel de Ligneris (1548–50, now the Musée Carnavalet, which was thoroughly altered by François Mansart). Here and especially in the design of the Fountain of Nymphs (1547–49, illustration, right), his moderate tectonic role is outshone by Goujon's sculpture. He was also responsible for the Château de Vallery.

Lescot's career is so scantily documented it is not known whether he ever visited Italy, or whether his knowledge of Italian practice was derived through the architecture and engravings that issued from the School of Fontainebleau. All of Lescot's known works have sculptural decoration by Trebatti and by Jean Goujon, who collaborated with him at the Louvre. Unlike the other architects of the French Flamboyant Gothic and Renaissance, Pierre Lescot was not from a line of masons, with practical experience, but the son of a seigneur. His father, also Pierre Lescot, was sieur of Lissy-en-Brie and Clagny, not far from Versailles, seigneuries that his son Pierre inherited.  Although, according to a eulogistic poem by Ronsard, Pierre Lescot busied himself zealously in early youth making drawings and paintings, and, after his twentieth year, with mathematics and architecture, his wealth and the duties of his offices appear subsequently to have interfered with his artistic activity. No other documented works are identified, though a dismissive reference in the memoires of the duc de Nevers, published long afterwards, instances "Magny" (i.e. Clagny) as "a painter who used to make inventions of masquerades and tourneys", as all court architects were expected to produce in the fifteenth to seventeenth centuries.

At his death, Lescot was succeeded at the Louvre by Jean Baptiste Androuet du Cerceau.

See also
 Architecture of Paris
 Cour Carrée
 French Renaissance architecture
Other outstanding architects of the French Renaissance:
 Philibert Delorme
 Jean Bullant
Androuet du Cerceau, a dynasty of designers and architects
Jean Goujon

Notes

External links

Catholic Encyclopedia 1908: "Pierre Lescot"
Imago Mundi: Pierre Lescot (in French)

1510s births
1578 deaths
Architects from Paris
16th-century French architects
Renaissance architects
16th-century French painters
French male painters